Joseph Calhoun (October 22, 1750April 14, 1817) was a Democratic-Republican member of the South Carolina House of Representatives (1804–1805) and represented South Carolina in the United States House of Representatives (1807–1811). Born in Staunton in the Colony of Virginia, he moved with his father to the Province of South Carolina in 1756 and settled in Granville District, on Little River, near the present town of Abbeville.

Received a limited education and engaged in agricultural pursuits. He served as a member of the South Carolina House of Representatives in 1804 and 1805 and was a colonel of the state militia. In 1807 he was elected as a Republican to the 10th United States Congress to fill the vacancy for the 6th congressional district caused by the death of Levi Casey and was sworn in on June 2, 1807. He was re-elected to the 11th Congress and served until March 3, 1811. He declined to be a candidate for re-election in 1810 and was succeeded by his first cousin John C. Calhoun. He was also a cousin of both John C. Calhoun's wife, Floride and father-in-law, John E. Colhoun.

Calhoun returned to his agricultural pursuits and engaged in milling. He died in Calhoun Mills, Abbeville District (now Mount Carmel, South Carolina), and was buried there in the family cemetery.

External links

1750 births
1817 deaths
Politicians from Staunton, Virginia
American people of Scotch-Irish descent
Calhoun family
American planters
Democratic-Republican Party members of the United States House of Representatives from South Carolina